Ellis Hall Jr. (born May 10, 1951, in Savannah, Georgia) known professionally as Ellis Hall is an American singer-songwriter, multi-instrumentalist, actor and composer. He was described as "The Ambassador of Soul" by conductor, Jeff Tyzik. Hall has been blind since the age of 18. Citing Ray Charles as his inspiration, Hall has written over 4000 soul, gospel, blues and pop songs, and has performed with Stevie Wonder, James Taylor, Natalie Cole, Patti LaBelle, Toby Keith, Herbie Hancock, George Benson, Bobby Womack, Sheila E, Maurice White of Earth, Wind and Fire, Tower of Power and Ray Charles. Charles signed Hall to his record label Crossover Records, and mentored him until Charles' death in 2004.

Early life and education 

Hall was born on May 10, 1951, in Savannah, Georgia, the son of Ellis Hall Sr. and Arvanna Harris. He and his brothers and sisters were raised in his parents' Southern Baptist household in Claxton, Georgia. Hall was diagnosed with congenital glaucoma at an early age. With only partial and deteriorating vision in his left eye, he was declared legally blind and the family moved to Boston, Massachusetts to allow him to attend The Perkins School for the Blind in Watertown. He began piano lessons in the third grade and caught the performing bug singing doo-wop by the corner store where he would take the money he earned singing and buy chips and soda. He really got serious about having a career in music at the age of 14 when he caught a performance of the B3 organ quartet Quint Harris & the Preachers at Jim Nance's Lounge in Boston and witnessed how they whipped the audience into a frenzy. After that show, Hall built his own drum kit so he could start playing drums and he added the bass to his instrument practice lineup. Ever mindful of his fate, he would practice all of his instruments in the dark so he would always be able to play them, with or without his vision. While in high school, he played football and competed in wrestling with his left eye remaining strong enough to manage, however, a wrestling injury to that left eye would take away his sight completely in 1969, at the age of 18.

Music career 

Due to his extensive musical education while in school, Hall eventually mastered the drums, piano, keyboards, guitar, upright and electric bass. He was able to develop and define himself as a vocalist as well, possessing a 5-octave range. Hall's first professional recording was for rocker Paul Pena on Capitol Records in 1971, playing bass and singing background vocals on his single "The River", "Adorable One" and "Woke Up This Morning." His first release as a solo artist was a version of the Motown song from the 60's "Every Little Bit Hurts." In 1973, he formed the Ellis Hall Group. The Ellis Hall Group was managed by Don Rosenberg and featured a rotating roster of members including: Ellis Hall (founder), Stanley Benders (percussion), David Fuller (drums), Michael Thompson (guitar), Freddie Mueller (bass/sound), Tony Vaughn (bass), Jeffrey Lockhart (guitar), Patti Unitas (vocals), Pat Thomason (vocals), Buddy Baptista (drums), Richie Marshall (drums) and Jackie Baird III (guitar). Their first gig was opening for Earth, Wind and Fire on the Boston stop of their 1974 tour. They would go on to perform for Jacqueline Kennedy Onassis at the Kennedy Compound, and for Nelson Mandela in Johannesburg, South Africa, Harvard University as well as open for The Temptations, The Spinners, Taj Mahal and Tower of Power, whose band leader, Emilio Castillo asked him on four separate occasions to join Tower of Power.

After relocating to California in the early 1980s, Hall took Castillo up on the offer to join Tower of Power. He sang lead vocals and composed music for their 1987 album Power (known as T.O.P. in Europe), on which he released the ballad "Some Days Were Meant For Rain" which was previously written while he was with the Ellis Hall Group and dedicated to his former manager who was having marital problems at the time. After leaving Tower of Power, Hall worked as a session musician and featured artist on records with artists including the California Raisins, John Klemmer, Carl Anderson, Larry Dunn, George Duke and Kenny G, the latter with whom he scored an R&B hit singing a Preston Glass-produced remake of Junior Walker and The All-Stars' "What Does It Take (To Win Your Love)" from the multi-platinum album, Duotones (Arista – 1986).

Hall both wrote and performed on the soundtracks of multiple television movies and films including The Lion King 2, Shrek 2, Chicken Run, Invincible, and Bruce Almighty, sang gospel tunes in the comedy film, Big Momma's House with Martin Lawrence, and sang a Louis Armstrong tune in the crime drama film Catch Me If You Can with Leonardo DiCaprio.

In 2001, Hall met Ray Charles at a Christmas party where he was performing. As he was playing "I Can See Clearly Now," Charles sent for him to come to his table. After saying hello, Charles stayed for the entire performance and got in touch with Hall the next day. Their association lasted until Charles' death in 2004. Hall is called a protege of Charles, but he was already a mature artist when their friendship began. Charles signed Hall to his Crossover Records label in 2002. Hall was the only artist Charles signed to his label as well as co-produced his first album. In October 2003, Hall played the Kennedy Center at Charles' request. Unfortunately, Ray died just prior to Hall's release of Straight Ahead In 2004. During the filming of the Taylor Hackford's Oscar-winning film RAY starring Jamie Foxx, Hall was an onset advisor.

Hall continues to be extremely prolific. In 2015, he was nominated for an Ovation Theater Award "Best Male Lead in a Musical" on his first major play "The Gospel at Colonus" as well as a cast nomination for The NAACP Theater Awards.

Mr. Hall is currently featured on three songs on the new Bootsy Collins release "The Power of The One," one of which, "Wishing Well," was originally written by Ellis and Michael Sembello. He is featured on the remake of the Steve Winwood hit "Roll With It" from Jermaine Lockhart, which was released on George Benson's new label venture. At the end of 2020, Mr. Hall was honored with the Lifetime Achievement for his work with music in film and television at the 15th Anniversary of the PVIFF-Peachtree Village International Film Festival (Atlanta GA)

On the Friday before Valentine's Day 2021, Ellis released a re-make of "Let Me Call You Sweetheart" featuring Tata Vega.

It was announced in August 2021 that Ellis would be will be releasing his next studio album, "Doc Kupka Presents: Let’s Make an Arrangement," on Strokeland Records (via Regime Music Group) on September 10, 2021. "Let’s Make an Arrangement" was co-written by Stephen “Doc” Kupka of funk and soul pioneers, Tower of Power, which Ellis also fronted.

Symphony 

On Charles' advice, Hall began to focus on the symphony show circuit after completing his album. Hall performed his first symphony at the Hollywood Bowl in 2005 in a commemoration for the 75th birthday of Ray Charles "A Night With Concord Records" presented by the Los Angeles Philharmonic Association's Jazz at the Bowl series and has since been playing with 81-piece orchestras internationally, including the Boston Pops and the Pittsburgh Symphony with Marvin Hamlisch conducting. Hall's first concept show was "Ellis Hall Presents: Ray, Motown and Beyond." In September 2016, he debuted his most recent concept show "Beyond Ellis Hall: Soul Unlimited" (conducted by Jeff Tyzik) where he adapted songs from David Bowie’s "Let's Dance" to "Something" by George Harrison (which Hall recorded on his album Straight Ahead featuring Billy Preston on organ). Both "Ray, Motown and Beyond" and "Soul Unlimited" Hall co-produced with his wife and manager, Leighala Jimenez-Hall.

Personal life 

Ellis Hall married his artist manager Leighala Jimenez-Hall in May 2013 two years after they met on the Legendary Rhythm and Blues Cruise in 2011. This makes him the stepfather of Jimenez-Hall's daughter Krystina Arielle.

Philanthropy 

Hall is involved with Gary Miller (producer for David Bowie, Donna Summer, Lionel Richie and others) in Rock Against Trafficking and Artists UNited Against Human Trafficking, a partnership between United Nations Office on Drugs and Crime and artists committed to working against the crime of trafficking in persons. He recorded his own version of Sting’s "Let Your Soul Be Your Pilot" for Rock Against Trafficking's compilation album as well as did the backend track for the classic "Set Them Free" from which comes the name of the album. On the 3-disc compilation Music To Inspire – Artists UNited Against Human Trafficking he provided the song "Be the Change."

He regularly returns to Boston for the Perkins School's annual gala event and has performed twice as the headliner with the Chorus in 2015 and 2018.

In 2020, Hall was one of the featured "Voices 4 One World" on the charity single "One World." The song reunited songwriters 30 years after they met in Moscow during the 1989 Glasnost event "Music Speaks Louder Than Words." Academy Award-winning songwriter Franke Previte ("(I’ve Had) The Time of My Life" from Dirty Dancing) and Pamela Phillips Oland (Frank Sinatra, Whitney Houston, Aretha Franklin) along with Estonian songwriters Sergei Manoukyan and Mikk Targo, created an entirely new recording of their collaboration with updated lyrics, retooled for the sole purpose of giving 100% of all proceeds to five major charity partners hit particularly hard by the pandemic (Musicians Foundation, The Actors Fund, First Responders Children's Foundation and the NAACP Legal Defense Fund). Hall returned to the project 30 years after singing the original demo recording of "One World," later recorded by Earth, Wind & Fire. The song reached #27 on the Billboard Top 30 Mainstream Adult Contemporary chart.

Discography 

 The Spirit Lingers On...and On – ESP-Disk (2005)
 Straight Ahead – Crossover Records (2004)
 Love Can Make It Better – Crossover Records (2004)
 The Spirit Lingers On – ESP-Disk (1999)
 From Where I Stand (with Carl Anderson) – Chameleon Records (1989)

Vocal credits

Filmography

Television

References

External links 

 Official website
 
 
 
 
 Ellis Hall Interview NAMM Oral History Library (2019)



1951 births
African-American jazz composers
20th-century African-American male singers
African-American pianists
African-American male singer-songwriters
American baritones
American tenors
American blues pianists
American male pianists
American blues singers
American country pianists
American country singer-songwriters
American gospel singers
American jazz pianists
American jazz organists
American male organists
American pop keyboardists
American pop pianists
American pop rock singers
American rhythm and blues keyboardists
American rhythm and blues singers
American rock pianists
American soul keyboardists
American soul singers
Rhythm and blues pianists
Blind musicians
American blind people
Singers from Los Angeles
20th-century American pianists
21st-century American pianists
Living people
Jazz musicians from California
Country musicians from California
Country musicians from Georgia (U.S. state)
21st-century organists
American male jazz composers
American jazz composers
21st-century American keyboardists
20th-century American keyboardists
21st-century jazz composers
21st-century African-American male singers
Singer-songwriters from California
Singer-songwriters from Georgia (U.S. state)